Anna Charlott Darcel Elendt (born 4 September 2001) is a German swimmer. She competed in the women's 50 metre breaststroke and women's 100 metre breaststroke at the 2019 World Aquatics Championships. She holds the National Record in the 100m breaststroke, with a time of 1:06.50, which she achieved at the German Swimming Championships on 4 June 2021 in Berlin.

Early life and education
Elendt was born 4 September 2001 and calls Dreieich, Germany her hometown. She is one of three children to her parents Melanie and Philipp Elendt.

She attended Carl von Weinberg Schule for high school. Collegiately, Elendt decided to live and train in the United States, and began competing for the University of Texas swim team in the autumn of 2020.

Career

2018 European Junior Championships
At the 2018 European Junior Championships in Helsinki, Finland in July 2018, Elendt won three medals. She won a silver medal in the 50 metre breaststroke, a bronze medal in the 100 metre breaststroke, and a bronze medal in the 4x100 metre medley relay.

2019 World Championships
In July 2019 at the World Aquatics Championships in Gwangju, South Korea, Elendt competed in two individual events and the 4x100 meter relay. She ranked 7th in the final of the 50 metre breaststroke with a time of 31.06. In the 100 metre breaststroke she swam a 1:08.70 and tied for 24th place in the prelims. On the 4x100 metre medley relay, Elendt swam a 1:08.74 on the breaststroke leg of the relay. The relay ranked 9th overall.

2020
At the 2020 Toyota US Open Championships, Elendt won the 100 metre breaststroke ahead of second place finisher Lydia Jacoby with a time of 1:07.50. Elendt earned the "Big 12 Swimming & Diving Newcomer of the Week" award for the week of December 1 following her performance at the US Open.

2021
During Elendt's first collegiate season for the Texas Longhorns, she received the "Big 12 Swimming & Diving Newcomer of the Week” award for the week of February 24 from the Big 12 Conference. The award recognized her accomplishment of winning the 100 yard breaststroke with a time of 1:00.56 and the 200 yard breaststroke with a time of 2:12.94 in the last dual meet of the season.

2021 German National Championships
On 4 June 2021, at the German National Swimming Championships, Elendt set a new national record in the 100 metre breaststroke with a time of 1:06.50 and was the first female German athlete to swim faster than 1:07 in the event. The next day, she broke the national record of Germany in the 50 metre breaststroke with her time of 30.67.

2020 Summer Olympics

Elendt qualified to compete at the 2020 Summer Olympics in Tokyo, Japan, in the 100 metre breaststroke as part of Germany's 2020 Olympic team. She was also one of the swimmers on the 4x100 metre medley relay at the 2019 World Championships that qualified the relay for the 2020 Olympics.

On 25 July, Elendt competed in the 100 metre breaststroke prelims, swimming a 1:06.96, ranking 16th for all prelims heats, and advancing to the semifinals.

References

External links

 

2001 births
Living people
German female swimmers
Place of birth missing (living people)
German female breaststroke swimmers
Swimmers at the 2020 Summer Olympics
Olympic swimmers of Germany
Texas Longhorns women's swimmers
World Aquatics Championships medalists in swimming
Medalists at the FINA World Swimming Championships (25 m)
21st-century German women